Naemi Liel Bär (born 14 February 2000) is a German ice hockey player for the Kölner Haie and the German national team.

She represented Germany at the 2019 IIHF Women's World Championship.

References

External links

2000 births
Living people
German women's ice hockey forwards